Jill Insley is a financial journalist for The Sunday Times writing for Question of Money.

Investment cat 

In a 2012 portfolio stock valuation challenge by The Observer, Jill Insley's pet cat, Orlando, outperformed a team of professional investors. In reaction, Insley wrote "My cat is a genius."

References 

English non-fiction writers
English women writers
English journalists
Living people
Year of birth missing (living people)